The Piaggio Stella P.VII was the first P series aircraft engine produced by Rinaldo Piaggio S.p.A. Based on its experience license-producing the Gnome-Rhône 7K, Piaggio sold the engine to be used on a wide range of Italian aircraft before and during World War II, including the record-breaking Caproni Ca.133.

Development
Having built engines under licence from Gnome et Rhône, Piaggio designed a seven-cylinder radial using the same principles. The engine, named P.VII for its seven cylinders, was one in a series of radial engines produced by Piaggio initially named Stella, meaning star. The engine was first run in 1933 and was produced in many models. One notable version was the P.VII Z which was fitted with a floatless Piaggio AS80 carburettor for aerobatic flight. It powered the Caproni Ca.133 flown by Renato Donati that, in 1933, broke the record for the longest duration in inverted flight.

Variants
P.VII C.16/35

Applications

 Breda Ba.28
 Caproni Ca.101
 Caproni Ca.113
 Caproni Ca.133
 Caproni Ca.148
 Caproni Ca.310
 Caproni Ca.311
 Caproni Ca.316
 Hispano HS-42
 IMAM Ro.41
 North American Sk.14A
 Savoia-Marchetti S.71
 Savoia-Marchetti SM.85

Specifications (C.35)

See also

References

P.VII
1930s aircraft piston engines
Aircraft air-cooled radial piston engines